A storyman is a comic writer or cartoon screenwriter

Storyman (band), duo from Ireland
The Storyman, album by Chris de Burgh 2006
Storyman (album), by bluegrass mandolin player Sam Bush  2016